Crown Royal is the seventh and final studio album by American hip hop group Run-D.M.C. It was released on April 3, 2001, by Arista Records.

It is the first and only Run-D.M.C. album with a Parental Advisory label, though previous Run-D.M.C albums, such as the 1986 Raising Hell, had included explicit lyrics. All songs except the title track featured guest artists, including Fred Durst, Stephan Jenkins, Sugar Ray, Everlast, Kid Rock, Nas, Prodigy, Fat Joe and Method Man.

Crown Royal peaked at number 37 on the US Billboard 200, and number 22 on the Top R&B/Hip Hop Albums chart.

The album was the last in the history of the group. After the murder of DJ Jam Master Jay, on October 30, 2002, the other group members, Joseph Simmons and Darryl McDaniels, announced the group's official disbanding at a press conference called to unveil the formation of a coalition of music industry artists and a fund intended to financially assist Mizell's family. This event took place on November 6, 2002.

Release and promotion
The release of the new album called Crown Royal was originally scheduled for October 12, 1999, but was later postponed for the summer of 2000. Representatives of the label said that the release of the album was postponed after managers of Kid Rock and Fred Durst refused to release their tracks as singles. These tracks were originally intended to be used as lead singles of the album. And so the release of the album was postponed to February 13, 2001, and then to March 6, and as a result the album was released on April 3, 2001.

The song recorded together with Method Man, "Simmons Incorporated", was released on the single in 1998 under the name "The Beginning (No Further Delay)". The songs "Crown Royal" and "Queens Day" were released on the promo single in 1999. But the main singles for the album were "Rock Show" and "Let's Stay Together (Together Forever)", released in early 2001.

Critical reception 

Crown Royal received mixed critical reviews. However, many critics have expressed their frustration at the lack of DMC participation. Some positive reviews have been published. Entertainment Weekly (4/6/01, p. 120) note that "on this hip-hop roast, new schoolers Nas and Fat Joe pay their respects with sparkling grooves... Run's rhymes are still limber." – Rating: B−

Rolling Stone (3/15/01, p. 78) said  "Crown Royal uses the same musical strategy as their minor 1993 comeback, Down with the King: guest artists, guest artists and more guest artists... But as on Down With the King, Run-DMC prove their old-school mastery without adding anything new to it; the tracks sink or swim depending on what the guest artist felt like bringing to the studio that day."

HipHopDX gave Crown Royal three and a half stars out of five, saying "Crown Royal is definitely not a classic but it does provide a few jams that many will really love."

NME gave Crown Royal a 6 out of 10 rating: "Proves the emperors' new clothes can look just as solid as their old threads." However, AllMusic rated the album only one and a half stars out of five: "Crown Royal spirals so recklessly into contrasting segments that it's easy to forget you are even listening to a Run-D.M.C. record. Lacking any discernible sense of direction or continuity, the once cutting-edge trio has seemingly lost touch with its original fan base."

Track listing

Sample credits
 "It's Over" contains replayed elements of "Marcia Religiosa" written by Carmine Coppola.
 "Queens Day" contains elements of "Round and Round" by Mary J. Blige.
 "Crown Royal" contains samples of "Theme from Exodus" by Ernest Gold and the Sinfonia of London.
 "The School of Old" contains samples and elements of "Dumb Girl" and "King of Rock" by Run DMC; contains replayed elements of "Open Invitation" written by Carlos Santana, Dennis Lambert, David Margen, Brian Potter, and Greg Walker.
 "Rock Show" contains replayed elements from "It Takes Two" written by Robert Ginyard; contains excerpts from and samples "King of Rock" by Run DMC.
 "Let's Stay Together (Together Forever)" Contains replayed elements from "Let's Stay Together" written by Al Green, Al Jackson Jr., and Willie Mitchell.
 "Ay Papi" contains samples of "Francesca" by Stan Kenton.

Charts

References

External links 
 Crown Royal at Discogs

Run-DMC albums
2001 albums
Arista Records albums
Albums produced by Dante Ross
Albums produced by Jermaine Dupri
Albums produced by John Gamble (record producer)